De Kova–Lejeune was a French professional cycling team that existed in 1973. It was sponsored by the wealthy Miriam De Kova and Cycles Lejeune. Included in the roster was 1966 Tour de France winner Lucien Aimar. The team wore pink jerseys.

Team roster
The following is a list of riders on the De Kova–Lejeune squad during the 1973 season, with age given for 1 January 1973.

References

External links

Cycling teams based in France
Defunct cycling teams based in France
1973 establishments in France
1973 disestablishments in France
Cycling teams established in 1973
Cycling teams disestablished in 1972